Thomas Sanders (18 October 1809 – 25 March 1852) was an English cricketer with amateur status. He was associated with Cambridge University and made his first-class debut in 1828.

Sanders was educated at Eton College and King's College, Cambridge. he was a fellow of King's 1831–45. During this time he was admitted to the Inner Temple and was called to the Bar in 1839.

References

1809 births
1852 deaths
English cricketers
English cricketers of 1826 to 1863
Cambridge University cricketers
Marylebone Cricket Club cricketers
People educated at Eton College
Alumni of King's College, Cambridge
Fellows of King's College, Cambridge
Members of the Inner Temple
English barristers
Gentlemen of Kent cricketers